Stéphanie Atger (born 11 October 1975) is a French politician of La République En Marche! (LREM) who was member of the National Assembly from 2019 until 2022, representing Essonne's 6th constituency.

Political career
Atger became a member of the National Assembly when Amélie de Montchalin was appointed Minister of Europe and Foreign Affairs. As her substitute, Atger took her place in the Assembly.

In parliament, Atger served on the Committee on Cultural Affairs and Education from 2019 until 2020 before moving to the Committee on Social Affairs.

She stood down at the 2022 French legislative election.

Political positions
In July 2019, Atger voted in favor of the French ratification of the European Union’s Comprehensive Economic and Trade Agreement (CETA) with Canada.

References 

1975 births
Living people
Deputies of the 15th National Assembly of the French Fifth Republic
21st-century French women politicians
Women members of the National Assembly (France)
La République En Marche! politicians
People from Sarcelles
Politicians from Paris
Members of Parliament for Essonne